Tiago Queiroz Bezerra (born 17 February 1987), is a Brazilian professional striker who plays for Saudi Arabian club Al-Orobah.

Career
On 30 June 2022, Neftçi announced that Bezerra had left the club after his contract wasn't renewed.

On 7 July 2022, Bezerra joined Saudi Arabian club Al-Orobah.

Honours

Individual
 Kuwait Federation Cup Best Player: 2015–16 
 Kuwait Federation Cup Top Scorer: 2015–16
 Uzbekistan Super League Best Player: 2018

References

 Tiago Bezerra, Adana Demirspor'da, sabah.com, 5 January 2016

External links

1987 births
Living people
Brazilian footballers
Clube de Regatas Brasil players
Brazilian expatriate footballers
Footballers from Brasília
Brazilian expatriate sportspeople in Turkey
Expatriate footballers in Turkey
TFF First League players
Saudi Professional League players
Uzbekistan Super League players
Qatar Stars League players
Saudi First Division League players
Altay S.K. footballers
Karşıyaka S.K. footballers
Al-Arabi SC (Kuwait) players
Adana Demirspor footballers
Al-Qadsiah FC players
Pakhtakor Tashkent FK players
Al-Khor SC players
Al-Sailiya SC players
Al-Orobah FC players
Brazilian expatriate sportspeople in Kuwait
Expatriate footballers in Kuwait
Brazilian expatriate sportspeople in Saudi Arabia
Expatriate footballers in Saudi Arabia
Brazilian expatriate sportspeople in Uzbekistan
Expatriate footballers in Uzbekistan
Brazilian expatriate sportspeople in Qatar
Expatriate footballers in Qatar
Association football forwards
Kuwait Premier League players